Otho Scott (1796/7 - March 9, 1864) was an American politician and lawyer from Maryland. He served as a member of the Maryland Senate, representing Harford County from 1838 to 1843.

Career
Otho Scott worked as a lawyer in Maryland. He was the chief codifier of the Maryland code in 1860.

Scott served as a member of the Governors' Council in 1827 and 1830. Scott served as a member of the Maryland Senate, representing Harford County, from 1838 to 1843.

Personal life
Scott's son William Grason Scott would serve as a state delegate.

Scott died on March 9, 1864, at the age of 67, in Baltimore.

References

Year of birth uncertain
1790s births
1864 deaths
People from Harford County, Maryland
Maryland state senators
Maryland lawyers
19th-century American politicians